The Trofeo Alcide Degasperi is a one-day cycling race held annually in Italy. It was part of UCI Europe Tour in category 1.2 from 2005 to 2015, when it was reserved for amateurs in 2016. It returned to the UCI Europe Tour in 2017.

Winners

References

Cycle races in Italy
UCI Europe Tour races
Recurring sporting events established in 1955
1955 establishments in Italy